Catherine Helen Spence (31 October 1825 – 3 April 1910) was a Scottish-born Australian author, teacher, journalist, politician, leading suffragist, and Georgist.  Spence was also a minister of religion and social worker, and supporter of electoral proportional representation. In 1897 she became Australia's first female political candidate after standing (unsuccessfully) for the Federal Convention held in Adelaide. Called the "Greatest Australian Woman" by Miles Franklin and by the age of 80 dubbed the "Grand Old Woman of Australia", Spence was commemorated on the Australian five-dollar note issued for the Centenary of Federation of Australia.

Early life and family
Spence was born in Melrose, Scotland, in October 1825, as the fifth child in a family of eight. Her father David Spence was a banker and lawyer, her mother was Helen nee Brodie. Her eldest sibling, Agnes died in infancy, and her sisters were Jessie, Helen, Mary and brothers David, William and John. Spence said she had a "happy childhood' and felt "well brought up" with her parents being "of one mind regarding the care of the family".  Spence had an early memory of the large funeral for Scottish Borders novelist Sir Walter Scott, in 1832. Spence's schooling from age four to thirteen, was at St. Mary's Convent School, Melrose whose head teacher was a Miss Phinn, whom Spence admired as "a born teacher in advance of her own times".

In 1839, following sudden financial difficulties, the family emigrated to South Australia, leaving her brother David jnr. in Scotland. Arriving on 31 October 1839 (her 14th birthday), on Palmyra, at a time when the colony had experienced several years of drought, the contrast to her native Scotland made her "inclined to go and cut my throat". Nevertheless, the family farm endured seven months of the drought,  an "encampment", growing wheat on an eighty-acre (32 ha) selection before moving to Adelaide.

Her father, David Spence, was elected first Town Clerk of the City of Adelaide. He was important in the City holding its elections using an early form of Single transferable voting, inspiring Catherine to later engage in activism in the cause of Proportional representation. 

In 1843, the municipality of Adelaide collapsed and her father died three years later. Spence wrote later that "after the break up of the municipality and loss of his income, my father lost health and spirits". Spence's mother died in 1886.

Of the "land of her adoption", Spence later wrote "As we grew to love South Australia, we felt that we were in an expanding society, still feeling the bond to the motherland, but eager to develop a perfect society." Unusually for a woman in those times, Spence learned about production, exchange and wealth in this early developing country, "the value of machinery, of roads and bridges, and of ports for transport and export". With her sisters, Spence opened a school and orphanage. She never married but did state she had refused two offers to wed.

Her brother John Brodie Spence went on to become a prominent banker and parliamentarian and her sister Jessie married Andrew Murray Hamdache.

Journalism and literature
Spence had a talent for writing and an urge to be read, so it was natural that in her teens she became attracted to journalism. Through family connections, she began with short pieces and poetry published in The South Australian. Catherine and her sisters also worked as governesses for some of the leading families in Adelaide, at the rate of sixpence an hour. For several years, Spence was the South Australian correspondent for The Argus newspaper writing under her brother's name until the coming of the telegraph.

Spence's first work, before the age of 30, was the novel Clara Morison: A Tale of South Australia During the Gold Fever.  It was initially rejected, but her friend John Taylor found a publisher in J. W. Parker and Son, and it was published in 1854. Spence received forty pounds for it, but was charged ten pounds for abridging it to fit in the publisher's standard format. It was given good reviews, and was the first novel written in Australia by a woman. At the same time Spence became employed as a journalist on The Register, but not initially with her own byline.

Spence's second novel Tender and True was published in 1856, and to her delight went through a second and third printing, though she never received a penny more than the initial twenty pounds. Then followed her third novel, published in Australia as Uphill Work and in England as Mr Hogarth's Will, published in 1861 and several more though some were unpublished in her lifetime including Gathered In  (unpublished until 1977) and Hand fasted (unpublished until 1984).

In 1888, she published A Week In the Future, a tour-tract of the utopia she imagined a century in the future might bring; it was one of the precursors of Edward Bellamy's 1889 Looking Backward.

Her final work, called A Last Word, was lost while still in manuscript form.

Social work and issues
Although Spence rejected marriage for herself, she had a keen interest in family life and marriage, and other people, and her life's work and her writing were devoted to raising the awareness of and improving the lot of women and children. She successively raised three families of orphaned children, the first being those of her friend Lucy Duval.

She was one of the prime movers, with Emily Clark, of the "Boarding-out Society". This organization had as its aim removing children from the Destitute Asylum into approved families and eventually to remove all children from institutions except the delinquent. At first treated with scorn by the South Australian government, the scheme was encouraged when the institutions devoted to the handling of troublesome boys became overcrowded. Spence and Clark were also appointed to the State Children's Council, which controlled the Magill Reformatory. Spence was the first (and to 1905 the only) female member of the Destitute Board.

Spence also got involved in co-operative garment manufacture to employ and give skills to those with no incomes, as a founding shareholder in the South Australian Co-operative Clothing Company.

Religion
Around 1854, having become disillusioned with some doctrines of the Church of Scotland, she began attending meetings of the Adelaide Unitarian Christian Church. She preached her first sermons at the Wakefield Street church in 1878, (though she was not the first woman to preach there, Martha Turner, sister of Gyles Turner and pastor of the Melbourne church from 1873, having preached there in the early 1870s) and she filled in for the minister J. Crawford Woods during his occasional absences between 1884 and 1889.

Politics - feminism, suffrage and "Effective Voting"
Spence was an advocate of Thomas Hare's scheme of proportional representation (PR), the single transferable voting (STV) system. At one stage, she said she considered this reform more pressing than that of woman suffrage itself. Her 1861 book A Plea for Pure Democracy was an important stimulus to Australia's adoption of PR. 

Spence campaigned for both female political involvement and PR. She spoke at events across Australia and to large political rallies. When Spence became vice-president of the Women's Suffrage League, she toured and was recognised as a powerful speaker for feminism, women's suffrage and electoral reform in Britain and the USA, This included speaking in 1893 conferences at Chicago World's Fair. She returned to find women's suffrage won in 1894 South Australia but did not live to see this in her native Scotland, where the vote was granted, for some women only, in 1918.

In 1897 she became Australia's first female political candidate when she stood (unsuccessfully) for the Federal Convention held in Adelaide. (The first women candidates for the South Australia Assembly ran in the 1918 general election, in Adelaide and Sturt).

Spence spoke at her 80th birthday in 1905:'I am a new woman, and I know it. I mean I am an awakened woman . . . awakened into a sense of capacity and responsibility, not merely to the family and household, but to the state: to be wise, not for her own selfish interests, but that the world may be glad that she had been born.'
Spence travelled and lectured both at home and abroad for what she called Effective Voting, also known as Proportional Representation. During her North American tour, she contributed a comprehensive essay to a seminal book on electoral reform published by Sandford Fleming in Canada.

She helped organize a trial of STV in city elections in Tasmania in 1896, it was not permanently adopted until shortly after her death. STV (sometimes known as the Hare-Spence voting system or the Hare-Clark electoral system) has been in use in Tasmania elections since that time.

Support of the arts
She was an early advocate of the work of Australian artist Margaret Preston and purchased her 1905 still-life "Onions". In 1911 Preston received a commission to paint a portrait of Spence, now held by the Art Gallery of South Australia, from a citizens' committee of Adelaide.

Death
She died at her home in Queen Street, Norwood, on Sunday 3 April 1910, at the age of 84. According to her wishes, her remains were buried in the General Cemetery, Brighton, South Australia alongside the grave of her brother J. B. Spence.

Recognition
On her 80th birthday, in 1905, a public gathering was held and South Australia's chief justice, Sir Samuel James Way said that Spence was "the most distinguished woman they had in Australia".

There are numerous memorials to Spence around the Adelaide city centre, including:

 a bronze statue in Light Square
 the Catherine Helen Spence building in the City West campus of the University of South Australia
 the Spence wing of the State Library of South Australia
 Catherine Helen Spence Street in the south-east of the city centre
 a plaque on the Jubilee 150 Walkway on North Terrace

At her birthplace in Melrose, Scotland there is also a memorial plaque to Spence, now part of the Townhouse Hotel.

The posthumous portrait of her, by Rose McPherson (later to become famous as Margaret Preston) is held by the Art Gallery of South Australia. This portrait was used as the basis of her appearance on 2001 edition of the Australian five dollar note,

In 1975 she was honoured on a postage stamp bearing her portrait issued by Australia Post.

The Catherine Helen Spence Memorial Scholarship was instituted by the South Australian Government in her honour for women aged 20–46. See separate article for a list of recipients.

Her image appears on the commemorative Centenary of Federation Australian five-dollar note issued in 2001 replacing that of the Queen.

One of the four schools at Aberfoyle Park, South Australia was named Spence in her honour. That school has since been amalgamated with another school to form Thiele Primary School.

The name of the suburb Spence in the ACT is sometimes mistakenly associated with Catherine Spence, but was actually named after the unrelated William Guthrie Spence.

Bibliography
Novels
 Clara Morison: A Tale of South Australia During the Gold Fever (1854)
 Tender and True: A Colonial Tale (1856)
 Mr. Hogarth's Will (1865) originally serialised as Uphill Work in the (Adelaide) Weekly Mail
 The Author's Daughter (1868) originally serialised as Hugh Lindsay's Guest in the (Adelaide) Observer
 Gathered In serialised in Observer and Journal and Queenslander, possibly never published in book form
 An Agnostic's Progress from the Known to the Unknown (1884)
 A Week in the Future  (1889)
 Handfasted (1984) Penguin Originals 

Non fiction
 A Plea for Pure Democracy (1861) pamphlet praised by John Stuart Mill and Thomas Hare
 The laws we live under (1880) for South Australian Education Department
 State children in Australia: A history of boarding out and its developments (1909) principally dealing with the work of Emily Clark This book was used by the British Home Secretary when at the end of her reign Queen Victoria asked him to formulate Child Laws in Britain that up until that time were non-existent. He wrote and thanked her for her work.
 Catherine Helen Spence: An autobiography (1910) (unfinished, but completed posthumously by Spence's friend Jeanne Young, working from diaries.)

References

External links
 "Catherine Helen Spence: a bibliography", State Library of South Australia
 
 Spence, Catherine Helen: An Autobiography at Project Gutenberg
 
 
 Gathered In: A novel at Sydney University
 Mr. Hogarth's Will at Sydney University

Susan Magarey Unbridling the Tongues of Women: a biography of Catherine Helen Spence, University of Adelaide Press, 214 pp,  Free Download

 Vicki Moore Grand Old Woman of Australia (1996) A stage play State Library of South Australia Manuscripts
 Vicki Moore Catherine Helen Spence: An Essay  Makers of Miracles The Cast of the Federation Story Melbourne University Press
 Office for Women
 

1825 births
1910 deaths
Australian autobiographers
Australian feminist writers
Australian Christian religious leaders
Australian suffragists
Scottish emigrants to colonial Australia
People from Melrose, Scottish Borders
Women autobiographers
Australian women novelists
Scottish literary critics
Scottish women literary critics
19th-century Australian writers
19th-century Australian educators
19th-century Australian women writers
19th-century Australian women
Australian literary critics
Australian women literary critics
Scottish suffragists
20th-century Australian women writers
20th-century Australian writers
19th-century women educators
Georgists
Australian women educators